William Glynn (1846 – 18 June 1895) was an Australian cricketer. He played one first-class match for Tasmania in 1870.

See also
 List of Tasmanian representative cricketers

References

External links
 

1846 births
1895 deaths
Australian cricketers
Tasmania cricketers
Cricketers from Tasmania
Place of birth missing